The Court of Probate Act 1857 (20 & 21 Vict. c. 77) was an Act of the Parliament of the United Kingdom. It transferred responsibility for the granting of probate, and letters of administration, from the ecclesiastical courts of England and Wales to a new civil Court of Probate. It created a Principal Probate Registry in London (Somerset House) and a number of district probate registries.

Sources
 Herber, Mark (2004). Ancestral Trails: The Complete Guide to British Genealogy and Family History, p. 214. Sutton Publishing.

References

External links
HMCS Probate Service

United Kingdom Acts of Parliament 1857